Arfurt is a village on the river Lahn. It is part of the town of Runkel in the Limburg-Weilburg district in Hesse, Germany. It lies roughly 60 km from Frankfurt am Main and was founded around 1150. The village has 950 inhabitants as of 2008.

References

Villages in Hesse